The Harrow is a small rural village in County Wexford in the southeastern corner of Ireland.

Pat Redmond bred the 1946 Irish Greyhound Derby champion "Steve" in the village.

See also
 List of towns and villages in Ireland

References

Towns and villages in County Wexford